Flames of Desire is a 1924 American silent film directed by Denison Clift and starring Wyndham Standing, Diana Miller and Richard Thorpe.

Cast
 Wyndham Standing as Daniel Strathmore  
 Diana Miller as Marion Vavasour  
 Richard Thorpe as Dick Langton  
 Frank Leigh as Ferand Vavasour  
 George K. Arthur as Lionel Caryll  
 Jackie Saunders as Viola Lee  
 Frances Beaumont as Lucille Errol  
 Hayford Hobbs as Secretary  
 Charles Clary as Clive Errol  
 Eugenia Gilbert as Mrs. Courtney Ruhl

References

Bibliography
 Solomon, Aubrey. The Fox Film Corporation, 1915-1935. A History and Filmography. McFarland & Co, 2011.

External links

1924 films
1924 drama films
Silent American drama films
Films directed by Denison Clift
American silent feature films
Films based on works by Ouida
American black-and-white films
Fox Film films
1920s American films